Stewart Ginn (c. 192220 September 1971) was an Australian radio, stage and television actor, best known as the character Nancarrow in the 1960s television comedy My Name's McGooley, What's Yours?.

Radio
Stewart Ginn first became known in radio, where he played the main role in The Air Adventures of Hop Harrigan (1954), among other roles.

Stage 
He then became a stage actor, his credits including:
 Sidney Howard's They Knew What They Wanted (1953), with Zoe Caldwell
 His Excellency (1954), with Barry Humphries; he won the Erik Kuttner Award for his performance
 The Heiress (1954), with Zoe Caldwell
 Garson Kanin's Born Yesterday (1954), with Zoe Caldwell and Ray Lawler
 Shakespeare's Henry V, at the 1964 Adelaide Festival of Arts, with John Bell, Dennis Olsen, Anna Volska and Max Meldrum
 John Mortimer's Lunch Hour (1965)
 Eugene O'Neill's A Moon for the Misbegotten (1966), with Ron Haddrick
 Arthur Miller's The Price (1970).

Television 
In 1959 he appeared in the television play They Were Big, They Were Blue, They Were Beautiful. Between 1966 and 1968 he appeared as Peregrine Nancarrow in the television comedy My Name's McGooley, What's Yours?, alongside Gordon Chater, John Meillon and Judi Farr.  In 1968 he won a Penguin Award as Best Supporting Actor for Nancarrow.  That year he reprised Nancarrow in the spin-off series Rita and Wally.

He also appeared in television programs such as Homicide, Matlock Police, Division 4, Spyforce and Birds in the Bush, and in the 1971 feature film Demonstrator.

Death 
He died suddenly in September 1971, aged 49.  He was in Melbourne, where he was filming an episode of Division 4.

Legacy 
Hector Crawford praised his performance in the Matlock Police episode "The Word is Progress" as "one of the finest pieces of drama acting to come out of the Crawfords company".

References

1920s births
1971 deaths
Australian male television actors
Australian male radio actors
Australian male stage actors
Australian male film actors
20th-century Australian male actors